Pragyan Medhi (born 8 January 2004) is an Indian professional footballer who plays as a midfielder for Indian Super League club NorthEast United.

Club career
Born in Guwahati, Assam, Medhi began his career with the Lutuma Football Academy in 2012. He soon moved to the youth teams at Gauhati Town Club and DSK Shivajians.

Indian Arrows
Prior to the 2020–21 season, Medhi was announced as part of the I-League side Indian Arrows, the development team of the All India Football Federation. He made his professional debut for the club on 29 January 2021 against Chennai City. Medhi came on as a 78th minute substitute as Indian Arrows were defeated 1–0.

NorthEast United 
On 7 November 2021, NorthEast United FC confirmed the signing of Pragyan Medhi on its social media and various other platforms for the upcoming season. He has signed with NorthEast United on a four–year deal.

International career
Medhi has represented India at youth level at the under-16 and under-17 levels.

Career statistics

References

External links
 Profile at the All India Football Federation

2004 births
Living people
Sportspeople from Guwahati
Indian footballers
Association football midfielders
Indian Arrows players
NorthEast United FC players
I-League players
Footballers from Assam
India youth international footballers